Linoma Beach is a census-designated place (CDP) in Sarpy County, Nebraska, United States, comprising the Linoma Beach historic district and adjacent land to the east. The community is in the southwest part of the county, on the east bank of the Platte River. It is bordered to the north, across U.S. Route 6, by the CDP of Beacon View. US-6 leads northeast  to Gretna and southwest  to Nebraska.

The community was first listed as a CDP prior to the 2020 census.

Demographics

References 

Census-designated places in Sarpy County, Nebraska
Census-designated places in Nebraska